The rock-pool blenny (Parablennius parvicornis) is a species of combtooth blenny found in the eastern central Atlantic Ocean.  This species reaches a length of  SL.

The fish is found in tidal hollows, rock pools, hence its English name. They are found in areas open to sunlight, between stones and thickets of seaweed. They mostly eat algae. It is found in Cape Verde, Canary Islands, Madeira and the Azores and along the coast of West Africa.

References

Further reading

 Fenner, Robert M. The Conscientious Marine Aquarist. Neptune City, New Jersey, USA: T.F.H. Publications, 2001.
 Helfman, G., B. Collette and D. Facey: The diversity of fishes. Blackwell Science, Malden, Massachusetts, USA, 1997.
 Hoese, D.F. 1986. A M.M. Smith and P.C. Heemstra (eds.) Smiths' sea fishes. Springer-Verlag, Berlin, Germany
 Maugé, L.A. 1986. A J. Daget, J.-P. Gosse and D.F.E. Thys van den Audenaerde (eds.) Check-list of the freshwater fishes of Africa (CLOFFA). ISNB, Brussels; MRAC, Tervuren, Flanders; and ORSTOM, Paris, France, Vol. 2.
 Moyle, P. and J. Cech.: Fishes: An Introduction to Ichthyology, 4th ed., Upper Saddle River, New Jersey, USA: Prentice-Hall. 2000.
 Nelson, J.: Fishes of the World, 3rd ed.. New York, USA: John Wiley and Sons., 1994
 Wheeler, A.: The World Encyclopedia of Fishes, 2nd ed., London: Macdonald., 1985

rock-pool blenny
Fish of the East Atlantic
Fauna of Macaronesia
Fauna of the Azores
Fauna of Madeira
Vertebrates of the Canary Islands
Marine fauna of West Africa
rock-pool blenny